The Madeiran wall lizard (Teira dugesii) is a species of lizard in the family Lacertidae. It is the only species in the genus Teira. The species is endemic to the Madeira Archipelago, Portugal. In the Azores, this lizard has become naturalized after involuntary introduction by the shipping trade between the two archipelagos. There are four recognized subspecies.

Etymology
The specific name, dugesii, is in honor of French physician and naturalist Antoine Louis Dugès.

Habitat
The Madeiran wall lizard's natural habitats are temperate forests and shrublands, Mediterranean-type shrubby vegetation, rocky areas, rocky shores, sandy shores, arable land, pastureland, plantations, rural gardens, and urban areas.

Subspecies
The following four subspecies are recognized as being valid, including the nominotypical subspecies.
Teira dugesii dugesii 
Teira dugesii jogeri ; named after German herpetologist Ulrich Joger
Teira dugesii mauli 
Teira dugesii selvagensis ; named after the Selvagens Islands

Nota bene: A trinomial authority in parentheses indicates that the subspecies was originally described in a genus other than Teira.

Description
The colouring is variable and tends to match the colour of the animal's surroundings, being some shade of brown or grey with occasionally a greenish tinge. Most animals are finely flecked with darker markings. The underparts are white or cream, sometimes with dark spots, with some males having orange or red underparts and blue throats, but these bright colours may fade if the animal is disturbed.

Behaviour
It is usually found in rocky places or among scrub and may climb into trees. It is also found in gardens and on the walls of buildings. The tail is easily shed and the stump regenerates slowly.

Diet
The Madeiran wall lizard feeds on small invertebrates such as ants and also eats some vegetable matter such as bananas.

Reproduction
Adult females of T. dugesii lay two to three clutches of eggs in a year with the juveniles being about  when they hatch.

Ecoepidemiology
T. dugesii is one of many species that may be parasitized by ticks and can act as a secondary or alternative reservoir for Lyme disease or other tick-borne zoonoses.  Large warm-blooded mammals like deer and boar seem to have become the first epidemiologic tank (and/or host) for European ticks.

References

Further reading
Engelmann, Wolf-Eberhard; Fitzsche, Jürgen; Günther, Rainer; Obst, Fritz Jürgen (1993). Lurche und Kriechtiere Europas: Beobachten und bestimmen. Radebeul, Germany: Neumann Verlag. 440 pp., 324 color plates, 186 figures, 205 maps. (Podarcis dugesii, new combination). (in German).
Mayer W, Bischoff W (1996). "Beiträge zur taxonomischen Revision der Gattung Lacerta (Reptilia: Lacertidae) Teil 1: Zootoca, Omanosaura, Timon und Teira als eigenständige Gattungen ". Salamandra 32 (3): 163–170. (Teira dugesii, new combination). (in German).
Milne-Edwards H (1829). "Recherches zoologiques pour servir à l'histoire des Lézards, extraites d'une Monographie de ce genre". Annales des Sciences Naturelles, Paris 16: 50–89 + Plates V–VIII. (Lacerta dugesii, new species, p. 84 + Plate VI, figure 2). (in French).

Lacertidae
Endemic fauna of Madeira
Fauna of Madeira
Lizards of Europe
Reptiles described in 1829
Taxa named by Henri Milne-Edwards